Sabitha Engira Sabapathi is a 2015 Indian Tamil-language soap opera starring Pandu, Nithya, CID Sakunthala, Shanmuga Sundaram and Priyanka. It aired Monday to Friday at 6:30PM IST on Raj TV from 4 January 2015 to 2 April 2016 for 75 episodes.

Cast
Main cast
 Pandu
 Nithya Ravindran
A. Sakunthala
 Shanmugasundaram

Additional Cast

 Sai Sakthi
 Vettri Velan
 Rajan 
 Nagalaskhmi
 Sangeetha Balan
 Manikandha Raju
 Ranganathan
 Ekavalli
 Priyanka 
 Mohana
 Kalavani Devi
 Priya
 Devika Shree
 Palraj
 C.S. Rajan

International broadcast
 Raj TV US
 TET

References

External links
 Raj TV Official Site
 Raj Television Network
 Raj TV on Youtube

Raj TV television series
2016 Tamil-language television series debuts
Tamil-language television shows